The Ponte Corvo, rarely Ponte Corbo, is a Roman segmental arch bridge across the Bacchiglione in Padua, Italy (Roman Patavium). Dating to the 1st or 2nd century AD, its three remaining arches cross a branch of the river and are today partly buried respectively walled up. The span-to-rise ratio of the bridge varies between 2.8 and 3.4 to 1, the ratio of clear span to pier thickness from 4.9 to 6.9 to 1.

Besides the Ponte Corvo, there are three more ancient segmented arch bridges in Padua: Ponte San Lorenzo, Ponte Altinate and Ponte Molino, as well as Ponte San Matteo.

See also 
 Roman bridges
 List of Roman bridges
 Roman architecture
 Roman engineering

References

Sources 
 

Roman bridges in Italy
Roman segmental arch bridges
Deck arch bridges
Stone bridges in Italy
Bridges completed in the 1st century
Bridges in Padua